Miss World 1964, the 14th edition of the Miss World pageant, was held on 12 November 1964 at the Lyceum Ballroom in London, UK. The winner was Ann Sidney of United Kingdom. She was crowned by Miss World 1963, Carole Joan Crawford of Jamaica.

Results

Contestants

  – Ana María Soria
  – Regina Croes
  – Victoria Lazek
  – Danièle Defrère
  – Maria Isabel de Avellar Elias
  – Mary Lou Farrell †
  now  – Marina Dellerene Swan
  now  – Linda Lin Su-Hsing
  – Paulina Vargas Gilede
  – Yvonne Mortensen
  – María de Lourdes Anda Vallejo
  – Maila Maria Östring
  – Jacqueline Gayraud
  – Juliane Herm
  – Lydia Davis
  – Mary Kouyoumitzou
  now  – Renske van der Berg
  – Araceli Cano
  – Rósa Einarsdóttir
  – Mairen Cullen
  – Mirka Sartori
  – Erica Joanne Cooke
  – Yoshiko Nakatani
  – Yoon Mi-hee
  – Nana Barakat
  – Norma Dorothy Davis
  – Gabrielle Heyrard
  – Helen Joseph
  – Leila Gourmala
  – Lyndal Ursula Cruikshank
  – Sandra Correa
  – Rolanda Campos
  – Vedra Karamitas
  – María José Ulla Madronero
  – Norma Dorothy Tin Chen Fung
  – Agneta Malmgren
  – Dolly Allouche
  – Nurlan Coskun
  – Alicia Elena Gómez
  – Jeanne Marie Quinn
  – Mercedes Hernández Nieves

Notes

Debuts
 Aruba and Montserrat competed in Miss World for the first time.

Returning countries
 Morocco last competed in 1958.
 Gibraltar and Honduras last competed in 1959.
 Lebanon last competed in 1961.
 Republic of China now Taiwan, Ecuador, Italy, and Uruguay last competed in 1962.

Nations not competing
  – Sonia Marino Cárdenas
  – No contest was held
  – No contest was held
  – Ofira Margalit (Military duty)
 – Katie Barnaba Faizah
  – Leonie Foo Saw Pheng
  – Edna Park
  – Olga Ceniceros loya

External links
 Miss World official website
 Pageantopolis – Miss World 1964

Miss World
1964 in London
1964 beauty pageants
Beauty pageants in the United Kingdom
November 1964 events in the United Kingdom